Coleophora amikanella is a moth of the family Coleophoridae. It is found in North Africa.

References

amikanella
Moths described in 1988
Moths of Africa